Jason Gilmore is an Australian professional rugby union football coach. He is currently the interim head coach of the  team that plays in the Super Rugby competition, having previously been assistant and defence coach. Gilmore took over as interim head coach of the Waratahs, alongside Chris Whitaker, in March 2021 following the dismissal of head coach Rob Penney. He had previously been head coach of the Australia U20 side, coaching the team between 2017 and 2020, first as an assistant coach, and then as head coach.

References

External links
LinkedIn profile

Living people
Australian rugby union coaches
Year of birth missing (living people)